Antônio Marcos de Azevedo, sometimes known as Marquinhos (born 23 November 1981) is a former Brazilian footballer.

External links
 Marcos De Azevedo profile at football.ch
 

1981 births
Living people
Brazilian footballers
Association football midfielders
Sociedade Esportiva Recreativa e Cultural Brasil players
SC Young Fellows Juventus players
FC La Chaux-de-Fonds players
Servette FC players
Ermis Aradippou FC players
Swiss Super League players
Swiss Challenge League players
Cypriot First Division players
Brazilian expatriate footballers
Expatriate footballers in Switzerland
Expatriate footballers in Cyprus
People from Toledo, Paraná
Sportspeople from Paraná (state)